This is the first edition of the event.

Seeds

Draw

References
 Main Draw

Launceston Tennis International
Launceston Tennis International - Doubles
2015 in Australian tennis